Theodotus of Ancyra may refer to two separate saints:

Theodotus of Ancyra (martyr) (fl. 303)
Theodotus of Ancyra (bishop) (fl. 431–432)